Carl Robert Wagner (January 31 1859 - July 25 1931) was a German entrepreneur and draftsman. As founder of the company Rowac, he was responsible for bringing the first industrially produced steel stool to market.

Early life 
Carl Robert Wagner was born in Chemnitz, Germany on January 31, 1859.

Career 
After successfully completing his apprenticeship in metalworking, Wagner travelled through Germany, Austria, Italy and Switzerland as a journeyman from 1874 to 1879 and acquired not only technical know-how, but also an enormous amount of self-dependence.

After completing his military service in Dresden, he worked first as a metalworker in a machine factory in Chemnitz and from 1885 as a machine technician for the Sächsische Maschinenfabrik. He turned down an offer to work as a foreman in the spinning department of the Wiedesche Maschinenfabrik. Instead, he became self-employed in 1888 and founded the company Rowac.

Death 
He died in Dresden, Germany on July 25 1931. His son, Kurt Robert Wagner, and two grandsons, Hans Kurt Wagner and Werner Alexander Wagner, took over management of the company.

Sources 

German businesspeople
1859 births
1931 deaths